Paritaprevir (previously known as ABT-450) is an acylsulfonamide inhibitor of the NS3-4A serine protease manufactured by Abbott Laboratories  that shows promising results as a treatment of hepatitis C. When given in combination with ritonavir and ribavirin for 12 weeks, the rate of sustained virologic response at 24 weeks after treatment has been estimated to be 95% for those with hepatitis C virus genotype 1.  Resistance to treatment with paritaprevir is uncommon, because it targets the binding site, but has been seen to arise due to mutations at positions 155 and 168 in NS3.

Paritaprevir was a component of Viekira Pak and Technivie. In May 2018, the FDA announced that Technivie and Viekira were to be discontinued. The discontinuation was voluntary and not related to the safety, quality, or efficacy of the medicine. It was estimated that both medications would be available until January 1, 2019.

References 

Molecular biology
Macrocycles
Cyclopropyl compounds
AbbVie brands
Pyrazines
Pyrrolidines
Breakthrough therapy
World Health Organization essential medicines
NS3/4A protease inhibitors